John Francis ("Frank") Tuohy, (2 May 1925 – 11 April 1999) was an English writer and academic. Born in Uckfield, Sussex, he attended Stowe School and went on to read Moral Sciences and English at King's College, Cambridge. On completion of his studies, he worked in numerous academic posts under the auspices of the British Council. This included postings in Finland, Brazil and Poland. In the 1950s, in the British Council School of São Paulo, Brazil, he ran a memorable course on The War Poets (WWI), introducing Stephen Spender and his contemporaries. His posting in Poland provided his inspiration for his 1965 novel The Ice Saints. The book received considerable critical acclaim and was awarded the James Tait Black Memorial Prize. Tuohy died in Shepton Mallet, Somerset in 1999 at a time when he was working on the uncompleted manuscript for a new novel following many years of writer's block.

Awards and distinctions
Katherine Mansfield-Menton Prize (1959)
James Tait Black Memorial Prize (1964)
Geoffrey Faber Memorial Prize (1965)
Fellow, Royal Society of Literature (1965)
E. M. Forster Award (1972)
Heinemann Award (1979)

Works
The Admiral and the Nuns with Other Stories. London, Macmillan, 1962; New York, Scribner, 1963.
The Animal Game. London, Macmillan, and New York, Scribner, 1957.
The Warm Nights of January. London, Macmillan, 1960.
The Ice Saints. London, Macmillan, and New York, Scribner, 1964.
Fingers in the Door. London, Macmillan, and New York, Scribner, 1970.
Live Bait and Other Stories. London, Macmillan, 1978; New York, Holt Rinehart, 1979.
The Collected Stories. London, Macmillan, and New York, HoltRinehart, 1984.

External links
 Obituary in The Independent

1925 births
1999 deaths
Alumni of King's College, Cambridge
English academics
English short story writers
Fellows of the Royal Society of Literature
People educated at Stowe School
James Tait Black Memorial Prize recipients
20th-century English novelists
20th-century British short story writers